Vegas Rat Rods (known as Sin City Motors in some regions) is an American reality television series. The series premiered on April 17, 2014, on Discovery Channel.
Season 5 due for release summer 2020.

Series overview

Episodes

Season 1 (2014)

Season 2 (2015–16)

Season 3 (2017)

References

External links
 

2010s American reality television series
2014 American television series debuts
Television series by Proper Television
Discovery Channel original programming